A farmhouse kitchen is a kitchen room designed for food preparation, dining and a sociable space. Typical of poorer farmhouses throughout the Middle Ages where rooms were limited, wealthier households would separate the smoke of the kitchen from the dining and entertaining areas. Farmhouse kitchens were also known as smoke kitchens before extractor hoods. Extractor hoods and modern stoves have allowed the reintroduction of farmhouse kitchen to architecture it is now the most popular kitchen design with various island set ups used for dining and storage. Household kitchen design often assumes that the functionality of the room includes cooking, dining and socializing but the term 'kitchen' includes rooms dedicated to cooking.

The stube or stüa 
The stiva (Romansh), stüa (Ladin) or stube (German), is the traditional living area of the German-speaking Alpine areas (Austria, Germany, Switzerland, and the Italian regions of Valtellina, South Tyrol, Trentino and Ladinia).

It is a room heated by a large stone or tile-covered stove and entirely lined with wood to keep the heat inside; the woods mostly used for the wall panels are chestnut, walnut, spruce, and Swiss pine. The logs are inserted into the stove through a small door that opens on an adjacent room, usually the kitchen or the corridor.

In the beginning, the term stube was used to indicate a room heated by a stove where the family would gather to chat, sew, weave, pray, and even sleep. Beyond their original function, during the Middle Ages, richly decorated stüe quickly became status symbols serving as a "state room" in noble houses, where guests were welcomed, private or community notarial deeds were drawn up, and meetings were held.

References

Kitchen